Eucalantica vaquero is a moth in the family Yponomeutidae. It is found in the United States (New Mexico and Arizona) and Mexico.

The length of the forewings is 7.5–8 mm.

Etymology
The species name vaquero means the Mexican cowboy, and refers to the distribution range of the new species roughly matching with the regions under vaquero traditions.

References

Moths described in 2011
Yponomeutidae